Kwavi may refer to:
the Kwavi tribe
the Kwavi dialect